U-19 may refer to one of the following German submarines:

  , was the lead ship of the Type U 19 submarines; launched in 1912 and served in the First World War until surrendered on 24 November 1918
 During the First World War, Germany also had these submarines with similar names:
 , a Type UB II submarine launched in 1915 and sunk 30 November 1916
 , a Type UC II submarine launched in 1916 and sunk 6 December 1916
 , a Type IIB submarine that served in the Second World War and was scuttled on 11 September 1944
 , a Type 206 submarine of the Bundesmarine that was launched in 1973 and scrapped in 1998

Submarines of Germany